WLXV (96.7 FM) is a radio station licensed to Cadillac, Michigan.

The station, which began broadcasting on July 7, 1974, has previously programmed easy listening and adult contemporary music as WITW, beautiful music as WEVZ, and CHR as WWLZ ("Lakes FM"). WWLZ was changed in 1994 to a simulcast of WLXT 96.3 FM in Petoskey, which continued until MacDonald-Garber Broadcasting, believing the Cadillac area needed its own music station (as opposed to simulcasts of stations from Traverse City or elsewhere), began the "Mix" format.

Mix 96.7 was programmed locally by Chris Nicholas, Program Director and Morning Show Host (the station used satellite programming from Westwood One Local's Hot AC format). Weekend programming included the Hot AC version of American Top 40 with Ryan Seacrest Sundays 8am till 12pm; The Hollywood5 with Kidd Kraddick Saturday Mornings from 6am - 10am; and The Beacon with Austin Harris on Sunday mornings.

WLXV also shares the same location and houses studios for its sister station 93.7 The Ticket which includes the nationally known show Free Beer and Hot Wings from 5am till 9am Monday thru Friday and 5am till 10am on Saturday. The rest of the format on WKAD is sports talk. WLXV's other sister station is WATT-AM which is a heritage station in the market and has been news talk for years.  Mix 96.7 is one of two Hot AC stations in Cadillac, the other being WCDY 107.9 FM which leans more toward CHR/Top 40.

On September 3, 2015, Mix signed off after 13 years, and 96.7 began stunting with a ticking clock. With sweepers stating “Tomorrow morning get ready to ride”, WLXV the next day flipped to Country as “96.7 The Bull”, launching with 10,000 songs in a row.

References

Sources 
Michiguide.com - WLXV History

External links

LXV
Hot adult contemporary radio stations in the United States
Radio stations established in 1987